Pedro de Alcántara Téllez-Girón y Beaufort Spontin, 11th Duke of Osuna, GE (10 September 1810 – 29 September 1844), was a Spanish peer, head of the House of Osuna.  He was one of the most important peers of his time, and was thirteen times a duke, twelve a marquess, thirteen a count and once a viscount.

Family origins 

Pedro was the son of Francisco Téllez-Girón, 10th Duke de Osuna and of María Francisca Beaufort Spontin y Álvarez de Toledo, 11th Marchioness of Almenara. The Téllez-Girón family had held title over the Dukedom of Osuna since 1562 with the rise of Pedro Téllez-Girón.

Biography 

Pedro inherited the Dukedom of Osuna after the death of his father in 1820.

He died in 1844 without leaving behind any heirs.  As a result, all of his titles, including the Dukedoms of the Infantado and of Osuna would pass on to his brother, Mariano Téllez-Girón.

Titles held

Dukedoms 

 XI Duke of Osuna
 X Duke of Pastrana
 XIV Duke of Béjar
 XIII Duke of Arcos
 XIV Duke of Benavente
 XIV Duke of the Infantado

 XV Duke of Plasencia
 XV Duke of Gandía
 X Duke of Mandas y Villanueva
 XIV Duke of Medina de Rioseco
 XI Duke of Lerma
 Duke of Estremera
 Duke of Francavilla

Marquessates 

XIII Marquess of Peñafiel, 
XV Marquess of Santillana, 
XVI Marquess of Tavara, 
Marquess of Terranova, 
Marquess of Cea, 
Marquess of Gibraleón, 
Marquess of Lombay, 
Marquess of Zahara, 
Marquess of Cenete, 
Marquess of Angüeso, 
Marquess of Almenara, 
Marquess of Algecilla.

Countships 

XVI Count of Benavente, 
VII Count of Fontanar, 
XV Count of Ureña, 
Count of Mayorga, 
Count of Bañares, 
Count of Oliva, 
Count of Mayalde, 
Count of Belalcázar, 
Count of Real de Manzanares, 
Count of Saldaña, 
Count of the Cid, 
Count of Melgar de la Frontera, 
Count of Bailén, 
Count of Villada.

Notes 

1810 births
1844 deaths
Dukes of Osuna
14
Spanish nobility